Kathleen "Kathy" Stella Weston (born May 19, 1958, in Reno, Nevada) is a retired female middle distance runner from the United States. She set her personal best (2.00.73) in the women's 800 metres at the 1976 Olympic trials.  She was also a member of the 1976 US Olympic team in the 800 metres.  Weston attended college at California State University, Northridge.

Achievements

References

trackfield.brinkster

1958 births
Living people
American female middle-distance runners
Oregon State University alumni
Sportspeople from Reno, Nevada
Athletes (track and field) at the 1975 Pan American Games
Athletes (track and field) at the 1976 Summer Olympics
Olympic track and field athletes of the United States
Pan American Games medalists in athletics (track and field)
Pan American Games gold medalists for the United States
Pan American Games silver medalists for the United States
Medalists at the 1975 Pan American Games
21st-century American women